FC Kuzbass Kemerovo was an association football club from Kemerovo, Russia, founded in 1946. It played professionally in 1946, 1948–1949, 1957–2002 and from 2005 to 2012, when it was dissolved. The highest level it achieved was the second-highest Soviet First League and Russian First Division, where it played in 1948-1949, 1957–1962, 1966–1969, 1971, 1973–1981, 1983–1990 and 1992-1993.

Team name history
1946 Azot Kemerovo
1947-1956 Khimik Kemerovo
1957 Shakhtyor Kemerovo
1958-1965 Khimik Kemerovo
1966-2000 Kuzbass Kemerovo
2001-2002 Kuzbass-Dynamo Kemerovo
2003 SibOVV Kemerovo
2004-2007 Kuzbass-Dynamo Kemerovo
2008–present Kuzbass Kemerovo

External links
Official website
Fan website

 
Association football clubs established in 1946
Association football clubs disestablished in 2012
Defunct football clubs in Russia
Sport in Kemerovo
1946 establishments in Russia